John James Gardner (October 17, 1845 – February 7, 1921) was an American Republican Party politician who represented New Jersey's 2nd congressional district in the United States House of Representatives for ten terms from 1893 to 1913, and was Mayor of Atlantic City, New Jersey.

At the time of his election to Congress, Gardner was the longest serving member in the history of the New Jersey Senate, having represented Atlantic County for five consecutive terms from 1878 to 1893.

Early life and career
Born in Atlantic County, Gardner attended the common schools and the University of Michigan Law School in 1866 and 1867. He served in the 6th New Jersey Volunteer Infantry from 1861 to 1865 and one year in the United States Veteran Volunteers. He engaged in the real estate and insurance business.

Political career
Gardner was elected alderman of Atlantic City in 1867. He served as Mayor of Atlantic City, New Jersey in 1868 to 1872 and again from 1874 to 1875. He served as member of the common council and coroner of Atlantic County in 1876. He was a member of the New Jersey Senate from 1878 to 1893, serving as its president in 1883. He engaged in agricultural pursuits. He was a delegate to the 1884 Republican National Convention.

Congress
Gardner was elected as a Republican to the Fifty-third and to the nine succeeding Congresses (March 4, 1893 – March 3, 1913). In April 1898, Gardner was among the six representatives who voted against declaring war on Spain. He served as chairman of the Committee on Labor. He was an unsuccessful candidate for reelection in 1912 to the Sixty-third Congress and resumed agricultural pursuits.

Death
He died of heart disease at his farm in Indian Mills in Shamong Township, New Jersey on February 7, 1921 and was interred in Atlantic City Cemetery in Pleasantville, New Jersey.

References

External links

John James Gardner at The Political Graveyard

1845 births
1921 deaths
Mayors of Atlantic City, New Jersey
Republican Party New Jersey state senators
University of Michigan Law School alumni
People from Shamong Township, New Jersey
Presidents of the New Jersey Senate
Union Army soldiers
Republican Party members of the United States House of Representatives from New Jersey
Nucky Johnson's Organization